Kenneggy Downs is a hamlet on the A394, between the towns of Helston and Penzance in Cornwall, UK. Kenegy is Cornish for bogs.

The Grade II listed, 18th-century public house the Coach and Horses was extended in the 19th century and was originally an inn on the turnpike between Penryn and Penzance. Built into the fireplace is a circa, early 19th-century granite milestone with the inscription ″From Helston 1".

On 3 September 1879 a tenement was sold by auction at Kanneggie Downs. Kenneggy Downs is north of the twin hamlets of Kenneggy.

There is also a Kenegie at Gulval, near Penzance.

References

Hamlets in Cornwall